Okulovo is a rural locality (a village) in Yenangskoye Rural Settlement, Kichmengsko-Gorodetsky District, Vologda Oblast, Russia. The population was 26 as of 2002.

Geography 
Okulovo is located 64 km northeast of Kichmengsky Gorodok (the district's administrative centre) by road. Olyatovo is the nearest rural locality.

References 

Rural localities in Kichmengsko-Gorodetsky District